The Danish ironclad Dannebrog was an armored frigate of the Royal Danish Navy that was originally
built as an 80-gun ship-of-the-line by Andreas Schifter was launched in 1850 but was reconstructed into a steam-powered ironclad in the early 1860s. She had an uneventful career before the ship was stricken from the navy list in 1875. The ship was converted into an accommodation ship that same year and served until she became a target ship in 1896. Dannebrog was broken up in 1897.

Description after conversion
The ship displaced . She had a single steam engine that drove her propeller. For long-distance travel, Dannebrog retained her three masts and was barque rigged. Her crew numbered 350 officers and crewmen.

Sources disagree about the ship's armament; naval historians Paul Silverstone and Robert Gardiner say that she had sixteen 60-pounder guns, but Johnny E. Balsved shows her with a dozen 60-pounder, 88-cwt., guns, two 60-pounder, 150-cwt. guns, and three 18-pounder guns immediately after her conversion. All of which were rifled muzzle-loading (RML) guns. Balsved then shows that she was rearmed with six 60-pounder, 150-cwt. and eight 24-pounder guns, all RMLs, after 1865 while Silverstone gives her a later armament of six  and ten  RML guns.

Construction and career

Dannebrog, named after the Danish national flag, was built by the Royal shipyard in Copenhagen as a 72-gun sail ship of the line. She was laid down on 28 April 1848, launched on 25 September 1850, and commissioned on 17 May 1856. The ship began conversion into an armored frigate on 21 May 1862 and the conversion was completed on 30 March 1864. On 14 July 1864, she ran aground off Aarhus. She was refloated the next day. Dannebrog had an uneventful career before the ship was stricken from the Navy List on 15 February 1875. The ship was converted into an accommodation ship that same year and served until she became a target ship on 30 May 1896. Dannebrog was broken up in 1897.

Commemoration
 
The figurehead of HDMS Dannebrog is now on display at the entrance to Marinestation København on Nyholm in Copenhagen. It has previously been on display in another location on the adjacent isle of Frederiksholm.

Notes

References

Citations
 
 
 
Royal Danish Naval Museum Database - List of Ships  - Dannebrog

Rxternal links

 Source

1850 ships
Ships designed by Andreas Schifter
Frigates of the Royal Danish Navy
Ships built in Copenhagen
Ironclad warships of the Royal Danish Navy
Maritime incidents in July 1864